The Niederhäslich Formation is a geologic formation in Germany. It preserves fossils dating back to the Sakmarian stage of the Permian period.

Fossil content

Synapsids 
 Ianthasaurus credneri
 Palaeohatteria longicaudata

See also 
 List of fossiliferous stratigraphic units in Germany
 Döhlen Formation

References

External links 
 

Geologic formations of Germany
Permian Germany
Sakmarian
Paleontology in Germany